"Your Swaying Arms" is the first single from the album Fellow Hoodlums by the Scottish rock band Deacon Blue.

Released in May 1991, it reached number 23 on the UK Singles Chart, but went as high as number six in Ireland, the last in the group's run of seven Irish top 10 hits between 1988 and 1991.

The releases contained two B-sides, "Fourteen Years" and "Faifley", both of which are rough, bluesy songs that Ricky Ross speaks and sings in a deep, raspy voice.

The 10" vinyl version, surprisingly, contained techno dance remixes of the otherwise placid track.

Track listing 
All songs written by Ricky Ross.

7" Single   (656893 7)
 "Your Swaying Arms" – 4:13
 "Fourteen Years" – 2:44

12" Single   (656893 6)
 "Your Swaying Arms (Extended Version)" – 5:57
 "Faifley" – 1:41
 "Your Swaying Arms" – 4:13

Cassette Single   (656893 4)
 "Your Swaying Arms" – 4:13
 "Fourteen Years" – 2:44

CD Single   (656893 2)
 "Your Swaying Arms" – 4:13
 "Fourteen Years" – 2:44
 "Faifley" – 1:41

10" Single    (656893 8)

References

Deacon Blue songs
1991 singles
Songs written by Ricky Ross (musician)
1991 songs
Columbia Records singles